Pradeep Khadka is a Nepali actor, model, scriptwriter, and filmmaker. His first film was Thulo Manchhe. He made his film debut in the 2015 film Escape. After the huge success of Prem Geet, he became a star of Nepali film industry. He is the highest paid actor in the Nepalese film industry. He is also a brand ambassador for Pepsi, TVS Motor Company, and Vivo in Nepal.

Early life and education 
After completing the School Leaving Certificate (SLC) he joined Prasadi Academy and completed higher secondary education in management. He has a master's in Business Administration.

Filmography 
Key

Awards 

|-
| 2016
| Prem Geet
| FAAN Awards – Best Couple
|

References

External links 
 
 
 

21st-century Nepalese male actors
Living people
1992 births
People from Lalitpur District, Nepal